Clément Joseph Marie Raymond Guillon (27 April 1932 – 9 July 2010) was the Roman Catholic bishop of the Roman Catholic Diocese of Quimper, France.

Ordained to the priesthood on 5 May 1957, Guillon was made coadjutor bishop of the Quimer Diocese on 17 March 1988 and was ordained bishop on 10 April 1988. He became the diocesan bishop on 3 May 1989, retiring on 7 December 2007.

Notes

1932 births
2010 deaths
Bishops of Quimper
Eudist bishops